Major General Andrew Douglas Mackay, CBE is a former British Army officer who commanded British forces in Helmand, Afghanistan. This was the principal opium-growing region and Britain was responsible in the NATO International Security Assistance Force for the suppression of opium.

Military career
Mackay served in the Royal Hong Kong Police for three years before he was commissioned into the King's Own Scottish Borderers in 1982. He served in Northern Ireland as a company commander and worked on the strategic and operational planning in the Balkans during the Bosnian War and Kosovo War. He was made Commanding Officer of 1st King's Own Scottish Borderers in 1998.

On promotion to Brigadier he served for a year in Baghdad, Iraq. In that capacity he was tasked with setting up and commanding the Civilian Police Assistance Training Team. CPATT was responsible for mentoring, training, equipping and organising the Iraqi Police and the Ministry of Interior. During this period he served alongside General David Petraeus and they are said to be close friends. He became Commander of 52nd Infantry Brigade in 2004 and commanded Task Force Helmand in Afghanistan from October 2007 in which role he led the successful assault on Musa Qala in the north of Helmand in December 2007. This action was later described as the "best operation to come out of Afghanistan in years" by the Pentagon. The author Stephen Grey subsequently wrote a best selling book of the battle for Musa Qaleh called Operation Snakebite within which Andrew Mackay and his style of leadership featured. 52 Brigade's tour of Helmand was controversial and led to considerable debate within military circles on the emphasis that Mackay placed on the role of Influence and non-kinetic operations. Mackay's approach to COIN was also featured in Mark Urban's three part BBC series Afghanistan: War without End. 
Dr Patrick Rose wrote that "52 Brigade was the first to utilise Influence centric approach; laying the foundations of structures used now".

He was appointed General Officer Commanding 2nd Division and Governor of Edinburgh Castle in May 2009 but resigned only a few months later in September 2009, citing "personal reasons". However, other sources attributed his resignation to frustration over the war in Afghanistan. He subsequently expressed the opinion, in a paper co-authored with Commander Steve Tatham and delivered to the Defence Academy, that the Ministry of Defence was "institutionally incapable of keeping pace with rapid change and the associated willingness to adapt". In 2011 he co-authored with Commander Tatham a book entitled Behavioural Conflict: Why Understanding People and Their Motivations Will Prove Decisive in Future Conflict.

The BBC have twice covered Mackay's recapturing of Musa Qala in specialist programming. In November 2014 he wrote and narrated a BBC Radio 4 documentary about his experiences of Afghanistan. Entitled 'The Lessons of War' he interviewed soldiers, senior US and British Generals including David Patraeus, politicians and civil servants to understand if there was ever a high level strategy for the campaign. Mackay told the BBC that "I think whoever you are when you go to an extreme environment such as Helmand, you are never the same person when you come back. I was interested in considering the role that I played as the commander of British forces in Helmand and the journey that it had taken me on."

In September 2015 BBC News ran a specialist feature, entitled 'The Art of Influence', featuring Mackay, on its News Journal website.

Mackay now runs a strategic advisory company – Complexas Ltd – which provides specialist services to the international extractive industries, specifically in Africa. Mackay and Tatham also collaborated with Professor Jim Derleth to write a new paper on Corporate Social Responsibility (CSR) in Africa.

References

British Army generals
Commanders of the Order of the British Empire
Recipients of the Commendation for Valuable Service
King's Own Scottish Borderers officers
NATO personnel in the Bosnian War
Living people
British Army personnel of the War in Afghanistan (2001–2021)
People from Elgin, Moray
Foreign recipients of the Legion of Merit
Year of birth missing (living people)